Several braille alphabets are used in South Africa. For English, Unified English Braille has been adopted. Nine other languages have been written in braille: Afrikaans, Ndebele, Sesotho, Northern Sotho, Swazi, Tswana, Venda, Xhosa, and Zulu. All print alphabets are restricted to the basic Latin alphabet, with diacritics in some cases; the braille alphabets are likewise basic braille with additional letters to render the diacritics. 

{|class=wikitable
|+Basic braille alphabet
|- align=center
|
|
|
|
|
|
|
|
|
|
|
|
|
|- align=center
|a||b||c||d||e||f||g||h||i||j||k||l||m
|- align=center
|
|
|
|
|
|
|
|
|
|
|
|
|
|- align=center
|n||o||p||q||r||s||t||u||v||w||x||y||z
|}

The Nguni languages – Ndebele, Swazi, Xhosa, and Zulu – have no diacritics and will not be discussed further.  The braille diacritics are shared by South African languages and are described in the sections that follow.  

Punctuation for all South African braille alphabets is as in English Braille.

Afrikaans Braille 

Afrikaans has braille cells for acute, ; grave, ; circumflex, ; and diaeresis, : 
 á,  é,  í,  ó,  ú,  ý
 à,  è
 ê,  î,  ô,  û
 ë,  ï,  ö,  ü

Sesotho and Tswana Braille 

Sesotho and Tswana treat the caron (haček) as an acute: 
 ê,  ô, : š

Venda Braille 

Venda has a unique letter, for the subscript circumflex, and treats ṅ as acute: 
 ḓ,  ḽ,  ṋ,  ṅ,  ṱ

References

UNESCO (2013) World Braille Usage, 3rd edition. 

French-ordered braille alphabets
Afrikaans
Nguni languages
Sotho-Tswana languages